Stephen Roth may refer to:

 Stephen John Roth (1908–1974), American judge in Michigan
 Stephen L. Roth, American judge in Utah